Wesley Brian Gardner (born April 29, 1961) is a retired Major League Baseball pitcher who was drafted by the New York Mets in the 22nd round of the 1982 Major League Baseball draft, out of the University of Central Arkansas.

New York Mets
Gardner made his major league debut with the Mets on July 29, pitching a perfect ninth inning in the Mets' 5-1 loss to the Chicago Cubs at Shea Stadium.

Boston Red Sox
On November 13, 1985, Gardner was traded to the Boston Red Sox along with John Christensen, Calvin Schiraldi and La Schelle Tarver for Bob Ojeda, Tom McCarthy, John Mitchell and Chris Bayer. On July 28, he made his first start since  with the New York–Penn League Little Falls Mets.

After starting the season in the Red Sox's bullpen, Gardner was moved into the starting rotation on June 28. In his first start, Gardner gave up only one earned run in seven innings pitched to earn the win. Gardner won his first four decisions as a starter, and enjoyed career highs in wins (8), strikeouts (106), ERA (3.50) and innings pitched (149) for the season.

Gardner's only post-season appearance came in game three of the 1988 American League Championship Series against the Oakland Athletics. He replaced Mike Boddicker in the third inning with the Sox behind 6-5, and had a no decision in the 10-6 loss to the A's.

Final season
Gardner spent two more seasons with the Red Sox before being traded to the San Diego Padres for two minor leaguers on December 15, . Gardner pitched poorly in San Diego, and was released on May 31, . He signed with the Kansas City Royals a month later, spending most of the season with their American Association affiliate, the Omaha Royals. Gardner only gave up one earned run in 5.2 innings with the big league club, however, he was released on August 8, 1991.

In , Gardner was inducted into the University of Central Arkansas Bears Hall of Fame.

Personal 
Gardner lists training bird dogs among favorite activities.

References

External links
, or Baseball Almanac, or Retrosheet, or Pura Pelota (Venezuelan Winter League)

1961 births
Living people
Baseball players from Arkansas
Boston Red Sox players
Central Arkansas Bears baseball players
Kansas City Royals players
Little Falls Mets players
Lynchburg Mets players
Major League Baseball pitchers
New York Mets players
Omaha Royals players
Pawtucket Red Sox players
People from Benton, Arkansas
San Diego Padres players
Tiburones de La Guaira players
American expatriate baseball players in Venezuela
Tidewater Tides players
University of Central Arkansas alumni